Łódź Widzew is a major railway station located in Widzew, an eastern district in the city of Łódź, Poland. It is located on a number of important railway lines including the Łódź Fabryczna to Koluszki and Warsaw railway line, the Widzew to Kutno railway line, and the Łódź Kaliska to Warsaw line. It consists of three island platforms and six tracks. The station is served by all passing passenger trains, including long distance and local services. Trains departing from the station serve major Polish cities, regional towns in the Łódź Province, and other stations in the Łódź metropolitan area. Operators include PKP Intercity, Polregio, and Łódzka Kolej Aglomeracyjna (ŁKA). The maintenance depot of Łódzka Kolej Aglomeracyjna is located at the station.

Public transit 
The station is served by local bus routes run by city bus operator MPK Łódź:
 Pass-through: W (special shift service to Dąbrowa station), N1A, N1B (night lines from Janów to Teofilów and Aleksandrów Łódzki)
 Terminating: 69A, 69B (from Retkinia), 75A, 75B (from Chocianowice), 75C (from Dąbrowa station), 82A, 82B (from Andrzejów station and Stróża).

The station has a passenger waiting room, ticket counter and car park.

An extension of the tram system to the station is planned.

Train services
The station is served by the following services:

 Intercity services (IC) Łódź Fabryczna — Warszawa Główna/Warszawa Wschodnia
 Intercity services (IC) Łódź Fabryczna — Warszawa — Lublin Główny
 Intercity services (IC) Łódź Fabryczna — Warszawa — Gdańsk Glowny — Kołobrzeg Intercity services (IC) Łódź Fabryczna — Bydgoszcz — Gdynia Główna Intercity services (IC) Łódź Fabryczna — Tomaszów Mazowiecki/Częstochowa — Kraków GłównyKoleo. PKP IC 13108 REYMONT Łódź Fabryczna — Kraków Główny Timetable. https://koleo.pl/pociag/IC/13108-REYMONT/
Intercity services (IC) Gdynia - Gdańsk - Bydgoszcz - Toruń - Kutno - Łódź - Częstochowa - Katowice - Bielsko-Biała Intercity services (IC) Wrocław Główny — Łódź — Warszawa Wschodnia Intercity services (IC) Zgorzelec - Legnica - Wrocław - Ostrów Wielkopolski - Łódź - WarszawaIntercity services (IC) Białystok - Warszawa - Łódź - Ostrów Wielkopolski - WrocławIntercity services (IC) Ełk - Białystok - Warszawa - Łódź - Ostrów Wielkopolski - Wrocław Intercity services (TLK) Gdynia Główna — Bydgoszcz/Grudziądz — Łódź — KatowiceKoleo. PKP TLK 45100 DOKER Katowice — Gdynia Główna. Timetable. https://koleo.pl/pociag/TLK/45102-FLISAK/
 InterRegio services (IR) Łódź Fabryczna — Warszawa Glowna 
 InterRegio services (IR) Łódź Kaliska — Warszawa Glowna 
 InterRegio services (IR) Ostrów Wielkopolski — Łódź — Warszawa Główna InterRegio services (IR) Poznań Główny — Ostrów Wielkopolski — Łódź — Warszawa Główna Regional services (PR) Łódź Fabryczna — Częstochowa 
 Regional services (PR) Łódź Kaliska — Częstochowa 
 Regional services (PR) Łódź Kaliska — Skarżysko-Kamienna''

References

External links 

 Schedule of the station - departures

Railway stations in Poland opened in 1901
Widzew
Railway stations served by Przewozy Regionalne InterRegio
Railway stations served by Łódzka Kolej Aglomeracyjna